Edward Sheldon may refer to:

 Edward Sheldon (1886–1946), American dramatist
 Edward Austin Sheldon (1823–1897), American educator, founding president of State University of New York at Oswego
 Edward Sheldon (politician) (1782–1836), English Member of Parliament
 Edward Sheldon (translator) (1599–1687), English translator of four Catholic works